Mihajlo Ristovski (born March 3, 1983) is a former Macedonian swimmer, who specialized in freestyle events. He represented the Republic of Macedonia at the 2008 Summer Olympics, placing among the top 60 swimmers in the 200 m freestyle.

Ristovski was invited by FINA through the Universality rule to compete as a lone male swimmer for Macedonia in the men's 200 m freestyle at the 2008 Summer Olympics in Beijing. Swimming against Georgia's Irakli Revishvili and two-time Olympian Emanuele Nicolini of San Marino in heat one, Ristovski powered his way into second place and fifty-fifth overall in his lifetime best at 1:57.45, which was not enough to put him further to the semifinals.

References

External links
NBC Olympics Profile

1983 births
Living people
Macedonian male freestyle swimmers
Olympic swimmers of North Macedonia
Swimmers at the 2008 Summer Olympics
Sportspeople from Struga